Clarke N. Hogan (born July 21, 1969 in Roanoke Rapids, North Carolina) is an American politician of the Republican Party. From 2002 to 2010 he was a member of the Virginia House of Delegates. He represented the 60th district in Southside Virginia, consisting of Charlotte and Halifax Counties, plus parts of Nottoway and Prince Edward Counties.

On March 9, 2009, Hogan announced that he would not seek reelection.

Notes

References

Clarke N. Hogan; Delegate (Constituent/campaign website)

External links

1969 births
Living people
Republican Party members of the Virginia House of Delegates
Sewanee: The University of the South alumni
People from South Boston, Virginia
People from Roanoke Rapids, North Carolina
21st-century American politicians